The 1988 NCAA Rifle Championships were contested at the ninth annual competition to determine the team and individual national champions of NCAA co-ed collegiate rifle shooting in the United States. The championship was held at Kilbourne Hall at the Virginia Military Institute in Lexington, Virginia. 

West Virginia, with a team score of 6,192, returned to the top of the team standings, finishing nine points ahead of defending champion Murray State. It was the Mountaineers fourth national title and fourth title in six years. 

The individual champions were, for the smallbore rifle, defending titlist Mike Anti (West Virginia), and, for the air rifle, Deena Wigger (Murray State).

Qualification
Since there is only one national collegiate championship for rifle shooting, all NCAA rifle programs (whether from Division I, Division II, or Division III) were eligible. A total of seven teams ultimately contested this championship.

Results
Scoring:  The championship consisted of 120 shots by each competitor in smallbore and 40 shots per competitor in air rifle.

Team title

Individual events

References

NCAA Rifle Championship
NCAA Rifle Championships
1988 in shooting sports
NCAA Rifle Championships